Andrew Marienhoff Sessler (December 11, 1928 – April 17, 2014) was an American physicist, academic (University of California, Berkeley), former director of the Lawrence Berkeley National Laboratory (1973–1980), humanitarian and former president (1998) of the American Physical Society.

Biography
Sessler was born in New York City in 1928.  He was educated at Harvard University (B.A. in mathematics) and Columbia University (Ph.D. in physics) with dissertation Hyperfine structure of 3He. From 1954 to 1959, he was a member of the faculty at Ohio State University before moving to the Lawrence Berkeley National Laboratory where he served as Lab Director in 1973-80.

His areas of expertise were the physics of particle accelerators, particle physics and plasma physics. In addition to accelerator physics, he also published theoretical work on quantum-theoretical statistical mechanics, atomic physics and superfluidity. Sessler was also active in the study group of the National Academy of Sciences of the long-term effects of the atomic bombing of Hiroshima and Nagasaki, and in an initiative group of APS against landmines. Sessler was a member of the American Committee for Peace in Chechnya.

In 1970, he became an Ernest Orlando Lawrence Award laureate. On January 13, 2014, Sessler and Allen J. Bard were awarded the Enrico Fermi Award.

Sessler lived in Oakland, California.  He died in 2014 after a long illness.

Books
 .

See also
 List of members of the National Academy of Sciences (Physics)

References

External links
 Official website
 E. J. N. Wilson, "Andrew M. Sessler", Biographical Memoirs of the National Academy of Sciences (2014)

American humanitarians
1928 births
2014 deaths
Lawrence Berkeley National Laboratory people
Members of the United States National Academy of Sciences
Scientists from California
Scientists from New York City
Columbia University alumni
Harvard University alumni
Ohio State University faculty
21st-century American physicists
20th-century American physicists
Activists from California
Presidents of the American Physical Society